Samanjerd (also Romanized as Sāmānjerd and Sāmān-e Jerd) is a village in Mashiz Rural District, in the Central District of Bardsir County, Kerman Province, Iran. At the 2006 census, its population was 216, in 41 families.

References 

Populated places in Bardsir County